In mathematics, Hölder summation is a method for summing divergent series introduced by .

Definition

Given a series

define

If the limit

exists for some k, this is called the Hölder sum, or the (H,k) sum, of the series.

Particularly, since the Cesàro sum of a convergent series always exists, the Hölder sum of a series (that is Hölder summable) can be written in the following form:

See also
Cesàro summation

References

Summability methods